C-C motif chemokine ligand 3 like 3 is a protein that in humans is encoded by the CCL3L3 gene.

Function

This gene is one of several cytokine genes that are clustered on the q-arm of chromosome 17. Cytokines are a family of secreted proteins that function in inflammatory and immunoregulatory processes. The protein encoded by this gene binds to several chemokine receptors, including chemokine binding protein 2 and chemokine (C-C motif) receptor 5 (CCR5). CCR5 is a co-receptor for HIV, and binding of this protein to CCR5 inhibits HIV entry. The copy number of this gene varies among individuals, where most individuals have one to six copies, and a minority of individuals have zero or more than six copies. There are conflicting reports about copy number variation of this gene and its correlation to disease susceptibility.

References